The 2001–02 A Group was the 54th season of the A Football Group, the top Bulgarian professional league for association football clubs, since its establishment in 1948. 

Defending champions Levski Sofia won their third consecutive title, and 23rd title overall.

Overview
The format of the league was changed from last season, with the intention of making the league more competitive. This resulted in the league being divided into two groups after the regular season. The top 6 teams from the regular season would continue in the championship round, while the bottom 8 teams would play in the relegation round. It was contested by 14 teams, and Levski Sofia won the championship.

Teams
Fourteen teams competed in the league. The promoted teams from the 2000–01 B Group were Spartak Pleven (returning to the top flight after a three-year absence) and Marek Dupnitsa (returning after a nineteen-year absence). The league also included Lokomotiv Plovdiv and Belasitsa Petrich after mergers with Velbazhd Kyustendil and Hebar Pazardzhik respectively. 

These teams replace Botev Plovdiv and Minyor Pernik, who were relegated at the end of the last season.

Stadiums and Locations

Personnel and kits

Managerial changes

First stage

League standings

Results

Championship group

Standings

Results

Relegation group

Standings

Results

Champions
Levski Sofia

Markov, Terziev, Nikolov, Batista, Barkanichkov, Gaucho and Kolev left the club during a season.

Top scorers

References

External links
Bulgaria – List of final tables (RSSSF)
2001–02 Statistics of A Group at a-pfg.com

First Professional Football League (Bulgaria) seasons
Bulgaria
1